Yoder Glacier is a glacier with abrupt valley walls, 3 miles (4.8 km) long, which is a western tributary to Kohler Glacier. Located just southwest of Morrison Bluff in the central part of Kohler Range, Marie Byrd Land. Mapped by United States Geological Survey (USGS) from ground surveys and U.S. Navy air photos, 1959–71. Named by Advisory Committee on Antarctic Names (US-ACAN) for Robert D. Yoder, United States Department of State, Chairman of the Interagency Committee on Antarctica, 1970–73.

References

Glaciers of Marie Byrd Land